Red-Headed Woman is a 1932 American pre-Code romantic comedy film, produced by Metro-Goldwyn-Mayer, based on the 1931 novel of the same name by Katharine Brush, and a screenplay by Anita Loos. It was directed by Jack Conway and stars Jean Harlow as a woman who uses sex to advance her social position. During the course of the film, Harlow's character breaks up a marriage, has multiple affairs, has premarital sex, and attempts to kill a man.

Plot
Lillian "Lil" Andrews (Jean Harlow) is a young woman, living in Ohio, who will do anything to improve herself. She seduces her wealthy boss William "Bill" Legendre Jr. (Chester Morris) and cleverly breaks up his marriage with his loving wife Irene (Leila Hyams). Irene reconsiders and tries to reconcile with Bill, only to find he has married Lil the previous day.

However, Lil finds herself shunned by high society, including Bill's father, Will Legendre, Sr. (Lewis Stone), because of her lower-class origins and homewrecking. When Charles B. Gaerste (Henry Stephenson), a nationally known coal tycoon and the main customer of the Legendres' company, visits the city, Lil thinks she has found a way to force her way into the highest social circles. She seduces Charles, then blackmails him into throwing a party at her mansion, knowing that no one would dare offend him by not showing up. It seems a social coup for Lil, until her hairdresser friend and confidante Sally (Una Merkel) points out that all the guests have left early to attend a surprise party for Irene (who lives across the street).

Humiliated, she decides to move to New York City, even if it means a temporary separation from her husband. Will Sr. finds Lil's handkerchief at Gaerste's place and correctly guesses what Lil has done. He shows his evidence to his son, who hires detectives to watch Lil. They find that she is conducting not one, but two affairs, with Charles and his handsome French chauffeur Albert (Charles Boyer). Bill shows Charles damning photographs.

When Lil learns that Charles has found out about her, she returns to Bill, only to find him with Irene. Furious, she shoots him, but he survives and refuses to have her charged with attempted murder. However, he does divorce her, and remarries Irene. Two years later, he sees her again, at a racetrack in Paris, in the company of an aged Frenchman. He discreetly hides Irene's binoculars. In the final scene, Lil and her elderly companion get into a limousine driven by Albert.

Cast 
 Jean Harlow as Lillian "Lil"/"Red" Andrews Legendre
 Chester Morris as William "Bill"/"Willie" Legendre, Jr.
 Lewis Stone as William "Will" Legendre, Sr.
 Leila Hyams as Irene "Rene" Legendre
 Una Merkel as Sally
 Henry Stephenson as Charles B. "Charlie"/"C.B." Gaerste
 Charles Boyer as Albert
 May Robson as Aunt Jane
 Harvey Clark as Uncle Fred

Production

The film proved difficult from its inception. F. Scott Fitzgerald and Marcel de Sano were originally hired to collaborate on creating a script adapted from Katherine Brush's 1931 novel. Fitzgerald initially turned down MGM's offer as their offer of $750 per week was not satisfactory; producer Irving Thalberg, however, raised the sum to $1,200 since he wanted Fitzgerald's name on the project. Fitzgerald then objected to working with de Sano, insisting that he work alone, but he was forced to comply. The two quickly experienced a falling out, but still finished the script in five weeks. Despite all this effort, however, Thalberg was concerned that the original story and the first draft of a script by Fitzgerald and de Sano was too serious, and offered the job of rewriting it to Anita Loos, instructing her to provide something that was more fun and playful and with a greater emphasis on comedy.  MGM then hired Anita Loos, who completed rough and revised drafts of the script between January and February 1932. (Both scripts are currently owned by Yale University at The Beinecke Rare Book & Manuscript Library.)

Red-Headed Woman was filmed at MGM Studios in Culver City, California. MGM's "English House" and "New York Street" backlots – both located in Lot 2 – were primary filming locations for the production.

Before casting Harlow, MGM considered casting Clara Bow as Lillian Andrews, who originally agreed to take the part but objected to the "future services" option demanded by the studio. Screenland (June 1932) (pg.60) also noted that Colleen Moore was considered for the part. In its April 12, 1932 issues, however, Motion Picture magazine (pg.11) reported seeing Jean Harlow at the premiere of the film Grand Hotel sporting red, "titian hair", suggesting she was involved in the production. The "Modern Screen" gossip column in The Hollywood Times confirmed these suspicions in May 1932 stating: "Guess who is going to be MGM's 'Red-Headed Woman'? No other than that famous platinum blonde, Jean Harlow. They will either have to get a new title for the picture, or a very large bottle of very extra red henna for Jean's crowning glory." The opening scene of the film shows Harlow's character getting her hair dyed red. The film's first line of dialogue is "So gentlemen prefer blondes, do they? Ha!" The film, in fact, was Jean Harlow's first film after having left Hollywood for a few months following a fall-out with Howard Hughes, as reported by Screenland.

Although uncredited, Jean Harlow's husband Paul Bern was the film's production supervisor.

Prior to the film's release, producer Thalberg worked with the Will Hays Office to shore up the censor's approval. Of particular concern were several scenes in which Harlow was partially undressed or making obvious sexual advances. Thalberg eventually agreed to seventeen cuts. Despite this fact, the film still received a number of complaints from cinema patrons.

Reception
Critical response to Red-Headed Woman was overwhelmingly positive. McCarthy of the Motion Picture Herald wrote: "Sexy, racy, bristling with snappy dialogue, funny, [Red-Headed Woman] is loaded with dynamite that can be dynamic entertainment, or an explosion of objections unless you handle it properly and with all the finesse and ability that your showmanship experience commands." The September 1932 edition of Screenland also gave the film a glowing review, writing: "The film [Red-Headed Woman] follows Katherine Brush's novel with satirical improvements by Anita Loos, who, fed up with blondes, gives red-headed women their due... See this for sheer amusement. Jean plays a mean part so cleverly that you can't help liking this wild red-headed woman." Along with this review, Screenland chose Red-Headed Woman as one of the six best pictures of the month and named Harlow's performance "one of the ten best portrayals of the month." (September 1932, pp. 356–357).

Red-Headed Woman opened in France as La Belle Aux Cheveux Roux and in Spain as La Pelirroja. Zárraga, a reporter for Cine-Mundial, (September 1932, p. 585), a Spanish-language magazine, wrote: "Red-Headed Woman was predestined to triumph. Step-by-step [Harlow] succeeded, and the secret of her success was not precisely in her statuary beauty, nor in her famous platinum-colored hair: it was, above all, in her disturbing way of kissing..."  The film was banned in the United Kingdom.

References

External links
 
 
 
 

1932 films
1932 romantic comedy films
American romantic comedy films
American black-and-white films
Films based on American novels
Films directed by Jack Conway
Metro-Goldwyn-Mayer films
Films with screenplays by Anita Loos
1930s English-language films
1930s American films